Eyaz Youssef Ahmed or Eyaz Zaxoyi (20 February 1960 Zakho – 20 January 1986 Mosul), was a celebrated Kurdish songwriter-singer and Composer from Zakho.

References 

1961 births
1986 deaths
20th-century Iraqi male singers
Kurdish-language singers
People from Zakho
Tuberculosis deaths in Iraq

ku:Eyaz Yusiv